Denmark plants trees was a Danish TV-telethon event held on Saturday 14 September 2019 which aimed to raise funds for planting 1 million new trees in Denmark in order to inspire Danes to climate action. The event is widely regarded as the world's first telethon to fight the climate crisis.

The event was broadcast live over 2½ hours on the Danish television station TV2 live from the forest tower in Næstved which is located in the middle of the forest.  During the event there were musical performances and famous guests. The Danish prime minister Mette Frederiksen planted one of the first trees. The telethon raised funds sufficient for planting 914,233 trees, nearly reaching the stated goal of 1 million trees. It was decided to keep the online donation website open, and two weeks later the goal of 1 million trees were reached.

The event was broadcast by TV2 which is the largest government-owned subscription TV-station in Denmark, aiming to place focus on climate change and the role of forests and trees in the countering climate change.
The format was developed by the Danish TV production company Tiki Media and the producer expressed hope that the event would spread to other countries in order to engage the public in the climate issue.

The trees were planted by the Danish organization Growing Trees Network in collaboration with the Danish Society for Nature Conservation.

References

Climate action plans
Telethons

Forestry initiatives
Environmentalism in Denmark